Toy Tinkers is a 1949 American animated short film produced in Technicolor by Walt Disney Productions and released to theaters on December 16, 1949 by RKO Radio Pictures. Set during Christmas time, the film shows Chip 'n' Dale trying to steal nuts from Donald Duck's home using toy weapons. The film was nominated for an Academy Award for Best Animated Short Film in 1950, but ultimately lost to Warner Bros'. For Scent-imental Reasons, a Pepe Le Pew Looney Tunes film directed by Chuck Jones.

Toy Tinkers was directed by Jack Hannah and features original and adapted music by Paul J. Smith which includes the song "Jingle Bells" and Schubert's Marche Militaire. The voice cast includes Clarence Nash as Donald and Jimmy MacDonald and Dessie Flynn as Chip and Dale respectively.

It was later reissued as Christmas Capers, and 16mm prints of this version still exist.

Plot
Chip and Dale's curiosity leads them into Donald's house after they see him chop down a tree near their log home to use as a Christmas tree. They follow Donald and their tree and they see nuts and candy through a window and decide to try to take them. They slip in through the mail slot and load the nuts into a toy truck. During the theft, Dale pretends to be in a make-believe neighborhood, but when he come across Chip, he beats Dale up for playing around. But Donald sees them stealing the nuts and uses the toys to foil them. When Chip and Dale catch on, Donald next dresses as Santa Claus and gives Chip a much larger present than Dale making him jealous and start fighting with Chip. The plan initially works and Donald traps them with a handgun inside the big nut and then crashes them in a toy police car. Donald then loads a pop gun with nuts and the chipmunks retaliate. At last, the confrontation escalates into full-out combat. Donald sets up a fort of presents on one side of the living room while Chip and Dale bombard him from across the room with a toy cannon. Dale covertly sneaks a Ca telephone into Donald's fort which Chip uses to distract Donald to transmit direct cannon fire. Angered, Donald loads the phone with dynamite, but it doesn't explode. When the chipmunks call him again, he answers & the TNT explodes. After the chipmunks have neutralized Donald's means to resist, they march back home, and in a scene reminiscent of The Spirit of '76, employ the help of the mechanical toys to transport the hoard of nuts.

Voice cast
 Donald Duck: Clarence Nash
 Chip: Jimmy McDonald
 Dale: Dessie Flynn

Adaptations
A comic book adaptation of the short was published in Walt Disney's Christmas Parade #2, printed by Dell Comics in 1950. This adaptation was titled "Christmas Fray" and "Such a Clatter" in reprints.

Releases
1949 – Theatrical release
1958 – Walt Disney Presents, episode #5.12: "From All of Us to All of You" (TV)
2010 – Mickey's Christmas Special

Home media
The short was released on December 11, 2007 on Walt Disney Treasures: The Chronological Donald, Volume Three: 1947-1950.

Additional releases include:
c. 1960 (Super8)
1985 – Cartoon Classics: The Continuing Adventures of Chip 'n' Dale Featuring Donald Duck (VHS)
1986 – Jiminy Cricket's Christmas (VHS)
2005 – Holiday Celebration with Mickey and Pals (DVD)

See also
 List of Christmas films

References

1949 animated films
Donald Duck short films
1940s Disney animated short films
American Christmas comedy films
Animated Christmas films
1940s English-language films
Films about toys
Films directed by Jack Hannah
Films produced by Walt Disney
Films scored by Paul Smith (film and television composer)
1940s Christmas films
1949 short films
American animated short films
Films about ducks
Films about rodents
American comedy short films
RKO Pictures short films
RKO Pictures animated short films
Animated films about birds
Animated films about mammals
Chip 'n' Dale films